Baba Kamal may refer to:
 Baba Kamal, Fars
 Baba Kamal, Hamadan
 Baba Kamal, Kermanshah